Semyonkino is a rural locality (a selo) and the administrative centre of Semyonkinsky Selsoviet, Aurgazinsky District, Bashkortostan, Russia. The population was 679 as of 2010. There are 7 streets.

Geography 
Semyonkino is located 29 km southwest of Tolbazy (the district's administrative centre) by road. Asavbashevo is the nearest rural locality.

References 

Rural localities in Aurgazinsky District